A digital delay line is a discrete element in digital filter theory, which allows a signal to be delayed by a number of samples. If the delay is an integer multiple of samples, digital delay lines are often implemented as circular buffers. This means that integer delays can be computed very efficiently.

The delay by one sample is notated  and delays of  samples is notated as  motivated by the role the z-transform plays in describing digital filter structures.

If a delay is not an integer of a sample additional filters are applied to account for the fraction of delay different from an integer. Hence delay lines with non-integer delay are called fractional delay lines.

Digital delay lines were first used to compensate for the speed of sound in air in 1973 to provide appropriate delay times for the distant speaker towers at Summer Jam at Watkins Glen in New York, with 600,000 people in the audience. New Jersey company Eventide provided digital delay devices each capable of 200 milliseconds of delay. Four speaker towers were placed  from the stage, their signal delayed 175 ms to compensate for the speed of sound between the main stage speakers and the delay towers. Six more speaker towers were placed 400 feet from the stage, requiring 350 ms of delay, and a further six towers were placed 600 feet away from the stage, fed with 525 ms of delay. Each Eventide DDL 1745 module contained many 1000-bit shift register integrated chips, and cost the same as a new car.

Digital delay lines are widely used building blocks in methods to simulate room acoustics, musical instruments and effects units. Digital waveguide synthesis shows how digital delay lines can be used as sound synthesis methods for various musical instruments such as string instruments and wind instruments.

See also
 Analog delay line

References 

Digital signal processing